The East Germany women's national under-18 basketball team was the girls' national basketball team of East Germany.  Their only championship participation was the 1965 FIBA European Championship for Junior Women, where they finished in ninth place.

Team results

See also
East Germany women's national basketball team

References

Basketball in East Germany
Basketball
Women's national under-16 basketball teams